V. Seshasayee (died 1958) was an Indian industrialist and the founder of the Seshasayee Group.

Origin of the Seshasayee Group 
V Seshasayee and R Seshasayee were not really brothers (although the latter married the former's sister). On completion of their studies, V. Seshasayee left for Singapore to improve his skills while R. Seshasayee pursued his career in India. R. Seshasayee's electrical wiring skills were noticed by Chief Electrical and Signals Engineer of the South Indian Railway, Mr. Winter, who helped him hone them. When V. Seshasayee returned to India, the two collaborated to start their first business venture which was called "The Seshasayee Brothers Engineering Works".

Pioneers of electricity in Madras Province 
Soon afterwards, they were employed by the Raja of Ramnad to electrify his palace and set up an ice-making plant. This was a success and shortly afterwards, they were working to electrify the city of Devakottai in the Chettinad region and Hindu temples all way from Madurai to Rameswaram.

At the time, Madras was the only town in the Province with electricity. Power supply was provided by a D.C. system installed by Crompton's for a British electricity company. The Seshasayees fought and got licences to light up Devakottai in 1927 and Trichinopoly-Srirangam in 1928. The Devakottai Company and the Trichinopoly Company were eventually merged in 1940 to form the South Madras Electric Supply Corporation Ltd.

R. Seshasayee's family

R. Seshasayee has two sons. Elder son is Dinakaran and younger one is Kandasamy. He had four daughters. R. Seshasayee is very compassionate. He supported the education of K.K.Raman, who married his elder daughter Akila later.

Death of R. Seshasayee 
R. Seshasayee had a keen interest in aviation. He was known popularly as "Pilot Seshasayee" by his peers. He showed his respect Mahatma Gandhi by dropping flowers from aircraft, while he was delivering a public speech at the National College campus. This was in the year 1934 and had a tremendous impact on his companion and business partner V. Seshasayee. Later, he died while he was landing his aircraft in Thennur ground due to a mechanical defect. It is a mystery who was involved in checking the aircraft prior to his trip. No one ever investigated in detail how the air craft failed. Sadly, we lost a genius who would have contributed more to Indian industrial development.

Later years 
R. Seshasayee founded Mettur Chemicals (1936–41), Fertilisers and Chemicals Travancore (1944–47), Aluminium Industries, Kundara (1950) and Travancore-Cochin Chemicals. He was succeeded by V. Seshasayee, K.K. Raman  and S. Viswanathan. Not clear why R. Seshasayee's were given this responsibility.

Who inherited the wealth and ownership of companies founded by R. Seshasayee?

After his death R. Seshasayee's brother in law V. Seshasayee and his son in law K.K. Raman took over the companies. Among his sons it appears that S. Dinakaran got some of his wealth. The younger one (S. Kandasamy) was only 16 years old when R. Seshasayee died. He never had a higher management position in any of R. Seshasayee's companies. S. Kandasamy worked for Metter Chemicals as a clerk all his life. He never had luxurious life. Kandasamy's subsequent generations still live middle class life though they are the descendants of Industrial Empire R. Seshasayee!

Ironically, all other elder siblings had rich life style both in India and abroad. Many of their descendants have settled in USA. What is left for S.Kandasamy's descendants is ONLY THE GLORY that was left by R.Seshasayee.

References

External links 
 Website of Seshasayee Papers and Boards Limited

1958 deaths
Indian industrialists
Year of birth missing
Businesspeople from Tamil Nadu